A sniper is a military or police member or civilian who shoot targets, humans or animals at long ranges using rifles equipped with telescopic sights.

Sniper or the sniper may also refer to:

People 
 Adam Lindgren (born 1985), known as the Swedish Sniper, a Super Smash Bros. Melee player
 Luc Poirier (ring name "Sniper", born 1961), Canadian professional wrestler
 MC Sniper (born 1979), South Korean male rapper

Arts, entertainment, and media

Fictional characters 
 Sniper (comics), a fictional Marvel Comics character
 Sniper (NX Files), a fictional character in NX Files
 Sniper (Team Fortress 2), one of the nine playable classes in the video game

Films and television

Films
 Sniper (1931 film), a 1931 Soviet drama film
 The Deadly Tower, a 1975 film), starring Kurt Russell, also known as Sniper
Sniper (film series), a series of action and war films which include:
 Sniper (1993 film), starring Tom Berenger and Billy Zane
 Sniper 2, a 2003 film starring Tom Berenger
 Sniper 3, a 2004 film starring Tom Berenger
 Sniper: Reloaded, a 2011 film starring Chad Michael Collins and Billy Zane
 Sniper: Legacy, a 2014 film starring Tom Berenger and Chad Michael Collins
 Sniper: Ghost Shooter, a 2016 film starring Chad Michael Collins and Billy Zane
 Sniper: Ultimate Kill, a 2017 film starring Chad Michael Collins, Billy Zane and Tom Berenger
 Sniper: Assassin's End, a 2020 film starring Chad Michael Collins, Sayaka Akimoto and Tom Berenger
 The Sniper (1952 film), by Edward Dmytryk
 The Sniper (2009 film), a Hong Kong action thriller film
 Sniper: Special Ops, a 2016 film
 Sniper (2022 film), a Chinese war film
 Sniper: The White Raven, a 2022 Ukrainian film

Television
 "The Sniper" (M*A*S*H), an episode of the television show

Games 
 Sniper Studios, an American game studio
 Sniper (1997), original title of SubSpace
 Sniper! (board game), a 1973 board game designed by James Dunnigan for TSR
 Sniper! (video game), a computer game adaptation of the board game
 Sniper Elite, a tactical shooter video game series developed by Rebellion Developments
 Sniper: Ghost Warrior , a first-person shooter series developed by City Interactive
 Sniper Fury (2015) is an online single player video game developed and published by Gameloft

Literature 
 The Sniper (novel), 1974 thriller by Nelson DeMille, re-published in 1989 with the Joe Ryker series, with the author as Jack Cannon
 "The Sniper" (poem) (1917), by W.D. Cocker
 "The Sniper" (story) (January 12, 1923), by Liam O'Flaherty

Music

Groups and labels
 Sniper (American band), an American glam punk band
 Sniper (group), a French musical act made up of Tunisiano, Aketo and Blacko

Songs
 "Sniper" (song), a 1972 song by Harry Chapin

Technology 
 AT-11 Sniper or 9M119 Svir, a Soviet anti-tank missile
 Beretta Sniper, a bolt-action sporting rifle
 Lockheed Martin Sniper XR, targeting pod for fighter aircraft

Other 
 Auction sniping, the act of placing a winning bid at the last possible moment

See also 
 
 
 Snipes (disambiguation)